"Fake Love" is a song by Canadian rapper Drake, released as the lead single from his 2017 album, More Life. It was co-written by Drake with Starrah, Vinylz, and Frank Dukes, while the latter two handled the song's production. The song was released for digital download on October 29, 2016, through Young Money Entertainment and Cash Money Records.

Composition and lyrics
"Fake Love" features an R&B beat. Lyrically, it focuses on peers who only appreciate Drake for his success, and would not care for him otherwise, hence the lyric, "fake people showing fake love to me".

The lyrics "That's when they smile in my face/Whole time they wanna take my place" are an interpolation of The O'Jays' song "Back Stabbers".

Critical reception
Sheldon Pearce of Pitchfork compared the song to "Hotline Bling" and called it "infectious and vaguely familiar, with top notes of several songs in the Drake canon".

Commercial performance
As of March 27, 2017, "Fake Love" has sold 784,000 copies in the United States.

Charts

Weekly charts

Year-end charts

Certifications

References

2016 singles
2016 songs
Cash Money Records singles
Drake (musician) songs
Song recordings produced by Frank Dukes
Song recordings produced by Vinylz
Songs written by Drake (musician)
Songs written by Frank Dukes
Songs written by Starrah
Songs written by Vinylz
Young Money Entertainment singles